The 2016 BRICS U-17 Football Cup was the first edition of the BRICS U-17 Football Cup. It took place in the Indian state of Goa during the 8th BRICS summit which was also held in India. It began on 5 October and concluded with the final on 15 October. Brazil won the cup defeating South Africa in the final. The tournament featured the under-17 teams of all five members of BRICS with the final taking place at the Fatorda Stadium.

Teams

Venues

Format
All five teams in the tournament shall play each other in a round-robin before the top two teams qualify for the final and the third and fourth place teams play in the third-place match.

Group stage

Table

Fixtures & results

Final and Third place match

Third-place match

Final

Winner

Goalscorers
4 goals

 Vinícius Júnior

3 goals

 Victor Oliviera
 Kirill Kolesnichenko
 Daniil Lopatin

2 goals

 Tao Qianglong

1 goal

 Cong
 Alan de Souza
 Paulinho
 Leonardo Franco
 Victor Gabriel
 Vitor Matos
 Rodrigo Nestor
 Vinicius Oliviera
 Marcos Santos
 Brenner
 Komal Thatal
 Georgy Chelidze
 Bophela
 Lyle Foster
 Luke Le Roux
 Mswati Mavuso
 Ndamalelo Radzilani

References

BRICS
2016 in Indian sport
International association football competitions hosted by India
BRICS
2016–17 in Indian football
Sport in Goa